386 is a year in the Julian calendar.

386 may also refer to:

 the number 386
 The i386 microprocessor architecture